K6 pipe is a diamondiferous diatreme in the Buffalo Head Hills kimberlite field of Northern Alberta, Canada. It is thought to have formed about 85 million years ago when is part of Alberta was volcanically active during the Late Cretaceous period. It is typical of melts that originated from the low mantle.

See also
List of volcanoes in Canada
Volcanism of Canada
Volcanism of Western Canada

References

Buffalo Head Hills kimberlite field